The Brazil women's national under-18 and under-19 basketball team, is controlled by the Brazilian Basketball Confederation, abbreviated as CBB, and represents Brazil in international women's under-19 and under-18 (under age 19 and under age 18) basketball competitions.

See also
 Brazil women's national basketball team
 Brazil women's national under-17 basketball team
 Brazil men's national under-19 basketball team

References

Basketball teams in Brazil
Brazil
Basketball